Shanghai Mental Health Center, also known as Shanghai Psychological Consultative Center is Psychiatric hospital in Shanghai, It have more than 2100 beds,  It focusing on treating mental disorders. It was founded in 1935, as Puci Rehabilitation Hospital. It was formerly called Shanghai Psychiatric Hospital. Since May 2006, the hospital has been affiliated to School of Medicine of Shanghai Jiao Tong University.

Current president: Xiao Zeping

Traffic

Metro Line 4, Shanghai Stadium Station
Bus: 89, 236, 44, 104, 72

See also
 Health in China

External links
Official website of SMHC

Hospitals established in 1935
Teaching hospitals in Shanghai
Xuhui District
1935 establishments in China
Shanghai Jiao Tong University